Patrick Shannon (1824 – December 16, 1871) was the 8th mayor of Kansas City, Missouri, serving from 1864 to 1866.

Biography
Shannon was born in 1824 in County Cavan, Ireland.  He immigrated to Kansas City in 1855, where he operated a dry goods business at Main and Front Streets.  He was elected to the city council in 1861.  During the American Civil War, he joined the Confederates and rose from private to major.  He was elected to the council again in 1864 and became mayor of Kansas City in 1865. He was re-elected to another term the following year.

During his term the Missouri Pacific Railroad reached Kansas City, the first volunteer fire department was raised, and the first gas lights were lit. 

He was buried in St. Mary's Cemetery.

References

1824 births
1871 deaths
Irish soldiers in the Confederate States Army
Mayors of Kansas City, Missouri
Politicians from County Cavan
Confederate States Army officers
19th-century American politicians